This is an inclusive list of science fiction television programs whose names begin with the letter O.

O
Live-action
Object Z (franchise):
Object Z (1965, UK) IMDb
Object Z Returns (1966, UK) IMDb
Ocean Girl (1994–1998, Australia)  Ocean Odyssey (UK)
Odyssey, The (1992–1995, Canada)
Odyssey 5 (2002, Canada)
Omega Factor, The (1979, UK)
On the Beach (2000, film)
Operation Neptune (1953) IMDb
Origin (2018)
Orphan Black (2013–2017, Canada)
Orville, The (2017–present)
Other Space (2015)
Others, The (2000)
Otherworld (1985)
Out of This World (franchise):
Out of This World (1962, UK)
Out of This World (1987–1991)
Out of Time (1988, film, pilot)
Out of the Unknown (1965–1971, UK, anthology)
Out There (1951–1952)
Outcasts (2011, UK)
Outer Limits, The (anthology) (franchise):
Outer Limits, The (1963–1965, anthology)
Outer Limits, The (1995–2002, anthology)
Overdrawn at the Memory Bank (1983, film)

Animation
Ōban Star-Racers (2006, France/Japan, animated)
Outer Space Astronauts (2009, partly animated)
Outlaw Star (1998, Japan, animated)
Overman King Gainer (2002–2003, Japan, animated)
Owl, The a.k.a. La Chouette (2003–2006, France, shorts, animated) (elements of science fiction in the "Flying Saucer" episode)
Ozzy & Drix a.k.a. The Fantastic Voyage Adventures of Osmosis Jones & Drixenol (2002–2004, animated)

References

Television programs, O